The Stockton Bridge is a road bridge that carries the Nelson Bay Road across the Hunter River, between Kooragang and Stockton in the Hunter Region of New South Wales, Australia. The bridge and Nelson Bay Road serve as the main transport route between Newcastle and the Tilligerry and Tomaree peninsulas in Port Stephens. The bridge carries motor vehicles and a central grade-separated shared cycleway and footpath.

History
Prior to the construction of the bridge, the Department of Main Roads operated a car ferry service between Wharf Road in Newcastle and Stockton.

In May 1955, the Newcastle Harbour Crossing Committee was formed by the Newcastle City Council to investigate options to cross the Hunter River. Options investigated included bridges from Hunter Street and Nobbys Head to Stockton and an underwater tunnel. All were rejected as not feasible.

The Kooragang Island reclamation project provided an answer. An initial plan to build a bridge from North Carrington to Stockton was rejected as it would interfere with shipping. The Tourle Street Bridge opened in February 1965 from Mayfield to Kooragang Island, but it would not be until 1968 that construction commenced on the Stockton Bridge. A two lane vertical-lift bridge was proposed before it was decided to build a four lane, 23-span concrete arch bridge with a  clearance over the shipping lane.

The Stockton Bridge was officially opened by Premier Robert Askin on 1 November 1971. At , at the time of its opening, it was the longest bridge to have been built by the Department of Main Roads and the second longest bridge in New South Wales after the Sydney Harbour Bridge.

References

External links

Arch bridges in Australia
Bridges completed in 1971
Concrete bridges in Australia
Hunter River (New South Wales)
Road bridges in New South Wales
Roads in the Hunter Region
1971 establishments in Australia